Jetson, Jetsons or The Jetsons may refer to:

  The Jetsons, an animated TV show that first aired in 1962, and the title family
 The Jetsons (comics), a comic book series based on the TV series
 Jetsons: The Movie,  a 1990 animated musical film based on the TV series
 The Jetsons: Cogswell's Caper!, a 1993 video game
 The Jetsons: Invasion of the Planet Pirates, a 1994 video game
 Nvidia Jetson, a series of computing boards
 Jetson Center for Youth, a former juvenile prison in East Baton Rouge Parish, Louisiana, United States
 Jetson, Kentucky, United States, an unincorporated community

See also
 The Jetzons, an American new wave band